Kristin is an American sitcom television series created by John Markus, starring Kristin Chenoweth. The series premiered on June 5, 2001 on NBC. The show was canceled on July 10, 2001, after six episodes had been screened (out of thirteen produced).

Plot
Kristin Yancey (Kristin Chenoweth), a perky Oklahoma woman, takes a job as a secretary in New York City while she looks for work in show business. What she does not know is that her boss Tommy Ballantine (Jon Tenney), hired her sight unseen from a local Baptist Church congregation in hopes of repairing his public image, which had been damaged by nearly nonstop sexual imbroglios.

Cast
 Kristin Chenoweth as Kristin Yancey
 Jon Tenney as Tommy Ballantine, Kristin's boss
 Ana Ortiz as Santa Clemente, Kristin's friend
 Larry Romano as Aldo Bonnadonna, Tommy's right-hand man
 Dale Godboldo as Tyrique Kimbrough, an employee of the firm
Christopher Durang as Reverend Thornhill of the Baptist congregation

Reception
Michael Speier of Variety called the series a "dud" with "incredibly stale one-liners, on-the-cheap production values and boring supporting players". Anita Gates in The New York Times wrote: "The plots and situations are just tired, like the show's saccharine theme song".

As of 2020, none of the series has been released on DVD for home consumption.

Episodes

References

External links
 

2001 American television series debuts
2001 American television series endings
2000s American sitcoms
English-language television shows
NBC original programming
Television shows set in New York City
Television series by CBS Studios